Harry Pritchard is the name of:

Harry Pritchard (British Army officer), British soldier
Harry Pritchard (footballer), English footballer